The men's team compound competition at the 2022 European Archery Championships took place from 7 to 11 June in Munich, Germany.


Qualification round
Results after 216 arrows.

Elimination round

Source:

References

Men's Team Compound